Paul James Walker (born 17 December 1960) is an English former professional footballer who played as a midfielder in the Football League for Brentford and is the club's youngest-ever debutant. He captained England Schoolboys and later managed in non-League football.

Career
Walker joined Brentford on schoolboy forms in September 1975 and made his professional debut on 14 August 1976, aged just 15 years, 7 months, 28 days. He made a total of 71 appearances for Brentford in the Football League, scoring five goals. Walker later played in South Africa for Johannesburg Rangers.

Career statistics

References

1960 births
Living people
English footballers
Brentford F.C. players
English Football League players
Association football midfielders
Chertsey Town F.C. managers
Isthmian League managers
England youth international footballers
English expatriate footballers
English expatriate sportspeople in South Africa
Expatriate soccer players in South Africa
Isthmian League players
Slough Town F.C. players
Marlow F.C. players
Egham Town F.C. managers
English football managers